María Luisa Albores González (born 1976) is a Mexican politician from the National Regeneration Movement who has been the Secretary of Social Development since 2018.

References 

Living people
1976 births
Women Secretaries of State of Mexico
Cabinet of Andrés Manuel López Obrador
21st-century Mexican politicians
21st-century Mexican women politicians
Morena (political party) politicians
Mexican Secretaries of Social Development